The Tuzos de la Universidad Autónoma de Zacatecas, commonly known as Tuzos UAZ, or just UAZ, is a Mexican football club based in Zacatecas City. The club was founded in 1990, and currently plays in the Serie A of Liga Premier.

Crest

Players

Current squad

Honours
Serie A de México:
Champion (1): Apertura 2022

Reserve teams
Tuzos UAZ (Liga TDP)
Reserve team that plays in the Liga TDP, the fourth level of the Mexican league system.

References

External links 

Association football clubs established in 1990
Football clubs in Zacatecas
1990 establishments in Mexico
Liga Premier de México